The 2014 Daily Mirror BDO World Trophy is the new major darts tournament run by the British Darts Organisation, hosted between 4–9 February 2014 at the Tower Ballroom, Blackpool. This event organized by the BDO Events - the new commercial arm of the British Darts Organisation

The Event marks the first BDO major event since the split in darts to not feature the BDO World Champion as Stephen Bunting left once he won the Lakeside Championships in 2014.

Prize Fund
Winner	£30,000	(men), £6,000 (women)
Runner Up  £12,000 (men), £2,400 (women)
Joint 3rd  2 x £5,000 (men), 2 x  £1,000 (women)	
Joint 5th  4 x £2,500 (men), 4 x  £500 (women)	
Joint 9th  8 x £1,250 (men), 8 x  £250 (women)	
Joint 17th  16 x £500 (men)
Totals	£80,000 (men), £14,400 (women)
Highest check out  £1,000
9 Dart Finish pot  £20,000
Sum total prize fund £115,400

Qualifiers

Men

Geert De Vos was ranked in the top 16 but asked not to be included in the draw. Alan Norris was given a wildcard to take Stephen Bunting's place after Bunting decided to switch to the PDC.

Draw

Men

Qualifiers

Women

Women

Television coverage
Eurosport showed the event.

References

BDO World Trophy
BDO World Trophy
BDO World Trophy
BDO World Trophy
Sport in Blackpool